Marcel Colomb First Nation (MCFN), Band #328, is a First Nations Band of approximately 449 Registered Swampy Cree (Maškēkowak / nēhinawak) and Rocky Cree (Asinīskāwiyiniwak) located in the area of Lynn Lake, Manitoba, Canada. Marcel Colomb First Nation is affiliated with the Swampy Cree Tribal Council.

The reserve of the MCFN is called Black Sturgeon Reserve, also referred to as "Mile 21" or "the Promised Land" by its members. Only 81 band members live on this reserve.

The Rock Cree people of the Black Sturgeon Falls Reserve are ancestral descendants of indigenous peoples originally from Pukatawagan and other areas within the Nickel Belt.  These Indigenous people have populated the Canadian Shield region of northern and central Canada since the retreat of the glaciers about 10,000 years ago.

Located within the reserve is a day care centre, water treatment plant, 14 houses, band office, and many other infrastructure projects under development. Ten additional family homes are under construction at the Black Sturgeon Falls Reserve.
 MTS Allstream provides local phone service to the Town of Lynn Lake and Black Sturgeon Falls reserve.
 BCN and Shaw Cable provide TV and Broadband access, to a limited number of homes.
  
Cell or mobile phone services may be available within the LGD of Lynn Lake, however were not present at this time.

Band administration

Chief: Priscilla Colomb - elected: 01/02/2016 to 01/01/2020 (took leave of absence Nov. 2019 and Evelyn Sinclair is presently acting as Vice-Chief)

Councillors:
 Evelyn Sinclair - elected: 01/02/2016 to 01/01/2020
 Sarah Copapay - elected: 01/02/2016 to 01/01/2020
 Angel Castel - elected: 01/02/2016 to 01/01/2020

List of previous chiefs:
 Andrew (Hank) Colomb - served between 13/07/2003 to 10/07/2015
 Douglas Hart - served between 11/07/2015 to 31/01/2016

References

External links
 Marcel Colomb First Nation members - Facebook group
 North West Community Futures Development Corporation - Marcel Colomb First Nation
 Town of Lynn Lake - Marcel Colomb First Nation
 Aboriginal Affairs and Northern Development Canada (AANDC)- Registered Population as of June, 2015
 Aboriginal Affairs and Northern Development Canada (AANDC)- Tribal Council Detail

First Nations governments in Manitoba
Swampy Cree